The Álvaro de Bazán class, also known as the F100 class, is a class of Aegis combat system-equipped air defence frigates in service with the Spanish Navy. The vessels were built by Spanish shipbuilder Navantia in Ferrol, with the lead ship of the class named for Admiral Álvaro de Bazán.

The ships are fitted with the United States Aegis weapons system allowing them to track hundreds of airborne targets simultaneously as part of its air defence network. The Álvaro de Bazán-class multi-role frigates are one of the few non-US warships to carry the Aegis system and its associated SPY-1D radar. The American , Japanese , Korean , Australian , and the Norwegian  also use the Aegis system.

The Álvaro de Bazán-class frigates are the first modern vessels of the Spanish Navy to incorporate ballistic resistant steel in the hull, along with the power plants being mounted on anti-vibration mounts to reduce noise and make them less detectable by submarines. The original contract for four ships was worth €1.683 billion but they ended up costing €1.81 billion.  it was estimated that the final vessel, F-105 would cost €834m (~US$1.1bn).

Ships in class

Six ships were originally planned, including Roger de Lauria (F105) and Juan de Austria (F106). These were cancelled but a fifth ship was later added as the F105 Cristóbal Colón (It has some improvements compared to the rest of the frigates of its class).

Export

The class is the basis of the Australian Hobart-class destroyers, previously known as the Air Warfare Destroyer. The Australian government announced in June 2007 that, in partnership with Navantia, three F100 vessels were built for the Royal Australian Navy (RAN) with the first due for delivery in 2014. However, this was delayed until 2017 when lead ship  was commissioned. All three ships were in service by 2020.

See also
 List of naval ship classes in service
 List of active Spanish Navy ships

References

External links 

 Armada Española
 Spanish Navy page on Andrew Toppan's Haze Gray and Underway
 See Armada Española Photos
 Spanish Ship Joins TR Strike Group
 Spain: Frigate not involved in combat
 Navy unveils $11b warship contract, Australian Broadcasting Corporation, accessed 20 June 2007.

Frigate classes
Frigates
Frigates of the Spanish Navy